Shirley Ann Walters (born November 12, 1948) is a Republican former member of the Arkansas House of Representatives from Greenwood in Sebastian County, Arkansas.

Born in Lonoke, Arkansas, Walters graduated from Arkansas Tech University in Russellville and was a teacher, business owner, and was engaged in the real estate business. From 2003 to 2008, she served in the Arkansas House. Her husband, Bill Walters, served as a Republican in the Arkansas State Senate from 1983 to 2000. In 2008, Bill Walters ran as a Democrat to succeed his term-limited wife in the District 62 seat in the Arkansas House, but he was defeated by the Republican nominee, Terry Rice of Waldron in Scott County.

Notes

1948 births
Living people
People from Lonoke, Arkansas
People from Greenwood, Arkansas
Arkansas Tech University alumni
Businesspeople from Arkansas
American real estate businesspeople
American educators
Republican Party members of the Arkansas House of Representatives
Women state legislators in Arkansas
21st-century American women